There are several rivers named Fundo River in Brazil:

 Fundo River (Espírito Santo)
 Fundo River (Sergipe)

See also 
 Passo Fundo River, Rio Grande do Sul, Brazil